ACU is a political-cultural venue in the city centre of Utrecht, in the Netherlands. The name ACU is derived from "Auto Centrale Utrecht" (Car Centre Utrecht) and is one of the many signs of its origin as an old squat. Nowadays it is still run by volunteers as an infoshop and social centre in order to keep it an independent and non-profit harbour within Utrecht's nightlife.

History 
The car centre ACU existed from 1935 to 1967. In 1976, the premises were squatted and adapted for habitation. Over time, multiple small businesses settled there as well, for example a bike-shop. The residents started a cinema in the former showroom in 1979. After two years the cinema was replaced by a coffeehouse to be able to provide a public space for the squatting community. Eventually this developed into a venue providing a stage for local and international bands since 1985.

After almost being evicted the squatters realized the premises had to be bought. A foundation "stichting Voorstaete" was established to buy the property. In 1994 Stichting Voorstaete bought the ACU and the squatted premises around the corner, which now houses the hostel Strowis. After years of refurbishing the building, the ACU reopened in 1998, and was completed as the current venue in 1999.

Activities
The ACU hosts a wide range of activities including: anarchist library the Barricade, benefits, concerts, films, meetings poetry events, political info nights, queer events and a vegan restaurant.

See also
Moira (Utrecht)
Ubica

References

External links
 Official website ACU 
 Kitchen Punx
 Strowis

Dutch culture
Buildings and structures in Utrecht (city)
Music venues in the Netherlands
Infoshops
Legalized squats
Squats in the Netherlands
Social centres in the Netherlands